UOA or UoA may refer to:

National and Kapodistrian University of Athens, Greece
Unit of Application, a geographic area for Medical Training Application Service
University of Aberdeen, Scotland
University of Abertay, Scotland
University of Adelaide, Australia
University of Alberta, Canada
University of Asmara, Eritrea
University of Auckland, New Zealand
UOA Group, a company in Malaysia
Used Oil analysis, a laboratory analysis of a lubricant's properties, suspended contaminants, and wear debris, performed during routine predictive maintenance to provide meaningful and accurate information on lubricant and machine condition.